Muscat Expressway (formerly known as the Southern Expressway) is a major highway in Muscat, the capital of Oman, hence the name.

The expressway runs largely parallel to Sultan Qaboos Street but further away from the coast and acts as a relief road. It is 54km long. The Batinah Expressway is a 256km 8-lane highway that continues from the Muscat Expressway in Halban to the United Arab Emirates border at Khatmat Malaha.

The Batinah Expressway, one of the most strategically important projects of last decade built at a total cost of over RO1.5bn, has been finally opened on May 7, 2018.

Package 1 starts from Al Falaj roundabout in the Wilayat of Barka and ends in the Wilayat of Al Rustaq. Package 2 spans the distance between the Rustaq to Suwaiq with a total length of 42 km.

The 46-km long Package 3 stretches from Suwaiq to Saham, where the fourth package starts and stretches to the Wilayat of Sohar with a total length of 50 km.

Package 5 starts at the Wilayat of Sohar and ends in the Wilayat of Liwa with a total length of 41 km.

The 45-km Package 6 starts from the Wilayat of Liwa and ends at Khatmat Malaha.

See also
 Sultan Qaboos Street
 Transport in Oman

References

2013 establishments in Oman
Roads in Muscat, Oman
Expressways in Oman